The 1833 New Hampshire gubernatorial election was held on March 12, 1833.

Democratic nominee Samuel Dinsmoor defeated National Republican nominee Arthur Livermore with 84.47% of the vote.

General election

Candidates
Samuel Dinsmoor, Democratic, incumbent Governor
Arthur Livermore, National Republican, former U.S. Representative

Results

Notes

References

1833
New Hampshire
Gubernatorial